Petalostylis is a genus of flowering plants in the family Fabaceae, endemic to Australia. It belongs to the subfamily Dialioideae.

References

Dialioideae
Flora of Australia
Fabaceae genera